Máté Fekete (born 22 August 1995) is a Hungarian football forward who plays for Budafok.

Career statistics

References

External links
 
 

1995 births
Footballers from Budapest
Living people
Hungarian footballers
Association football midfielders
Budafoki LC footballers
ESMTK footballers
Nemzeti Bajnokság I players
Nemzeti Bajnokság II players
Nemzeti Bajnokság III players